PAB may refer to:
 Bilaspur Airport (IATA airport code)
 Panamanian balboa, ISO 4217 currency code
 Parker Center, formerly the Police Administration Building for the Los Angeles Police Department
 Patent Appeal Board, an administrative body within the Canadian Intellectual Property Office
 Pennsylvania Association of Broadcasters
 Ping An Bank
 Planning Accreditation Board
 Poly(A)-binding protein
 Polyclonal antibody
 Pseudobulbar affect, a disorder of the expression of emotion
 Pay-as-bid auction
 Port aux Basques, a town in the Canadian province of Newfoundland and Labrador